Fabrizio Turriozzi (16 November 1755 - 9 November 1826) was an Italian Catholic cardinal.

Born in Toscanella, he was created cardinal by Pope Pius VII at the consistory of 10 March 1823.  Made Cardinal of Santa Maria in Aracoeli on 16 May 1823. He participated in the conclave of 1823 that elected Pope Leo XII.  He died in Rome in 1826.

Notes

External links

1755 births
1827 deaths
19th-century Italian cardinals
People from the Province of Viterbo
Cardinals created by Pope Pius VII